The 2004 William Hill Greyhound Derby took place during May & June with the final being held on 5 June 2004 at Wimbledon Stadium. The winner Droopys Scholes received £100,000.

Final result 
At Wimbledon (over 480 metres):

Distances 
¾, ½, neck, 2½, ¾ (lengths)
The distances between the greyhounds are in finishing order and shown in lengths. One length is equal to 0.08 of one second.

Quarter-finals

Semi-finals

Competition report
One of the ante-post favorites Droopys Shearer bypassed the event recuperating following a turbulent Scottish Greyhound Derby campaign. The very first heat on 6 May resulted in the fastest winner of the night when Tels Coogee Boy won in 28.85; the Pall Mall champion Tims Crow also started well with a customary fast starting win. The following night saw two of the big Irish favourites impress, Droopys Scholes recorded a very fast 28.60 and the Premier Fantasy won in 28.80, the latter had come to prominence in December 2003 when he won the Comerford Cakes National Puppy Stakes at Shelbourne Park, a competition that saw Droopys Scholes win the consolation final. The best of the third set of Derby heats was Drop Goal Jonny (28.81).

The second round resulted in many of the major contenders duly posting a second consecutive win including Droopys Scholes, Big Freeze, Droopys Demaggio, defending champion and the new Scottish Derby champion Farloe Verdict, Premier Fantasy and Drop Goal Jonny. Round three ended with undefeated campaigns for Droopys Scholes, Farloe Verdict and Premier Fantasy while Rhincrew Seagal went fastest in 28.52 and looked a major threat. Both Indian Ruler and Droopys Cahill suffered unlucky exits.

A star studded quarter final line up would have to result in at least one of the undefeated records going but they started with Droopys Demaggio claiming the first heat from Big Freeze and Tims Crow. The eagerly awaited second heat was won by Ballymac Kewell with Droopys Scholes finishing second and Farloe Verdict and Drop Goal Jonny crashing out of the competition. Premier Fantasy duly won and was the only undefeated runner left. The fourth and final heat went to Fire Height Dan who was showing great stamina for an early paced runner.

The semi finals would be a third quick run for the 12 runners left and that surprisingly had no effect on Tims Crow and Fire Height Dan who both qualified for the final split by Rhincrew Seagal; the pair were performing superbly over a distance that was slightly longer than they were used to. The second semi was won by Ballymac Kewell beating Droopys Scholes and Big Freeze, the event favourite Premier Fantasy finished badly lame.

In a competitive final Tims Crow bolted from the traps which effectively ended the hopes of Fire Height Dan who needed to lead but soon had to settle for an early third-place position behind both Tims Crow and Droopys Scholes who also made a great start. The other three runners made poor starts, particularly favourite Rhincrew Seagal, although he did finish well. Tims Crow maintained his lead but ominously Droopys Scholes was within striking distance. As they approached the finish Droopys Scholes took a decisive lead overtaking Tims Crow who was pipped to second place by a strong finishing Big Freeze.

See also 
 2004 UK & Ireland Greyhound Racing Year

External links
Greyhound Board of Great Britain
Greyhound Data

References

Greyhound Derby
English Greyhound Derby